In mathematics, a binary function (also called bivariate function, or function of two variables) is a function that takes two inputs.

Precisely stated, a function  is binary if there exists sets  such that

Alternative definitions
Set-theoretically, a binary function can be represented as a subset of the Cartesian product , where  belongs to the subset if and only if .
 is then defined to be this .

(That is, the same pair of parentheses is used to indicate both function application and the formation of an ordered pair.)

Examples
Division of whole numbers can be thought of as a function.

If  is a positive definite matrix, this yields an inner product.

Functions of two real variables

Restrictions to ordinary functions
In turn, one can also derive ordinary functions of one variable from a binary function.

Generalisations
The various concepts relating to functions can also be generalised to binary functions.
For example, the division example above is surjective (or onto) because every rational number may be expressed as a quotient of an integer and a natural number.
This example is injective in each input separately, because the functions f x and f y are always injective.
However, it's not injective in both variables simultaneously, because (for example) f (2,4) = f (1,2).

One can also consider partial binary functions, which may be defined only for certain values of the inputs.
For example, the division example above may also be interpreted as a partial binary function from Z and N to Q, where N is the set of all natural numbers, including zero.
But this function is undefined when the second input is zero.

A binary operation is a binary function where the sets X, Y, and Z are all equal; binary operations are often used to define algebraic structures.

In linear algebra, a bilinear transformation is a binary function where the sets X, Y, and Z are all vector spaces and the derived functions f x and fy are all linear transformations.
A bilinear transformation, like any binary function, can be interpreted as a function from X × Y to Z, but this function in general won't be linear.
However, the bilinear transformation can also be interpreted as a single linear transformation from the tensor product  to Z.

Generalisations to ternary and other functions

The concept of binary function generalises to ternary (or 3-ary) function, quaternary (or 4-ary) function, or more generally to n-ary function for any natural number n.
A 0-ary function to Z is simply given by an element of Z.
One can also define an A-ary function where A is any set; there is one input for each element of A.

Category theory
In category theory, n-ary functions generalise to n-ary morphisms in a multicategory.
The interpretation of an n-ary morphism as an ordinary morphisms whose domain is some sort of product of the domains of the original n-ary morphism will work in a monoidal category.
The construction of the derived morphisms of one variable will work in a closed monoidal category.
The category of sets is closed monoidal, but so is the category of vector spaces, giving the notion of bilinear transformation above.

See also 

 Arity

References

Types of functions
2 (number)